The Qatar Handball Association (QHA) is the governing body of handball and beach handball in Qatar. QHA is affiliated to the Asian Handball Federation (AHF), Qatar Olympic Committee and International Handball Federation (IHF) since 1978.

National teams
 Qatar men's national handball team
 Qatar men's national junior handball team
 Qatar men's national youth handball team
 Qatar women's national handball team
 Qatar women's national junior handball team
 Qatar women's national youth handball team

Competitions hosted

International
 2018 IHF Super Globe
 2017 IHF Super Globe
 2016 IHF Super Globe
 2015 World Men's Handball Championship
 2015 IHF Super Globe
 2014 IHF Super Globe
 2013 IHF Super Globe
 2012 IHF Super Globe
 2011 IHF Super Globe
 2010 IHF Super Globe
 2005 Men's Youth World Handball Championship
 2002 IHF Super Globe
 1999 Men's Junior World Handball Championship

Continental
 2016 West Asian Women's Handball Championship
 2015 Asian Men's Club League Handball Championship
 2014 Asian Men's Club League Handball Championship
 2013 Asian Men's Club League Handball Championship
 2012 Asian Men's Club League Handball Championship
 2012 Asian Men's Junior Handball Championship
 2006 Asian Games
 2005 West Asian Games
 2004 Asian Men's Handball Championship

Medals Table (Handball)

International medals

Continental medals

Medals Table (Beach Handball)

International medals

Continental medals

Affiliated Clubs
 Al Arabi SC
 Al-Duhail SC
 Al Rayyan SC
 Al Sadd SC
 El Jaish SC

References

External links
 Official website Arabic
 Qatar Handball Association at the IHF website.

Handball governing bodies
Handball in Qatar
Handball
Asian Handball Federation
1978 establishments in Qatar